Corinne Masiero (born 3 February 1964) is a French actress. She was born in Douai. She began acting in her late 20s, initially appearing in the theatre before moving on to the screen. She is best known for her lead role in the 2012 film Louise Wimmer, for which she was nominated for the Cesar Award for best actress. She has also had notable roles in Rust and Bone, 11.6, and plays the lead role in Capitaine Marleau.

Debut
Masiero began acting relatively late in life. She also lived on the streets for a few years before discovering theatre. At the age of 28, after having worked at various odd jobs, she joined a theatre company. Her early roles were in comedies by Georges Feydeau and adaptations of Rainer Werner Fassbinder.

Political commitment
In 2014, during the municipal elections, Masiero ran on the Left Front slate in Roubaix. She supported François Ruffin, for La France insoumise during the 2017 French legislative election.

At the 2021 César Awards, Masiero stripped naked in protest against the French government's plan of Covid-19 restrictions.

Filmography

References

External links

 

French film actresses
1964 births
Living people
People from Douai
20th-century French actresses
21st-century French actresses
French stage actresses
French television actresses
French people of Italian descent